Derrick Sarfo Kantanka, (born 14 February 1995), best known as Amerado, is a Ghanaian rapper from Kumasi. He is the curator of Yeete Nsem, Ghana's first news casting rap series.

Early life and education 
Derrick Kantanka was born and raised in Ejisu, Kumasi, in the Ashanti Region of Ghana. He attended KNUST Senior High School.

Music career 
After placing third at the Solid FM Freestyle Show in 2015, Amerado caught the attention of music producer, sound engineer and A&R, Azee Ntwene, who signed the rapper to his label MicBurnerz Music. Amerado was featured on a song by Mix Master Garzy intended to promote peace around the 2016 Ghanaian general election. The following year, Amerado released his first single I AM, which Pulse Ghana included among their top 10 Ghanaian songs in January 2017. He released his first EP Rapmare that November. In 2018, Amerado was featured on Sarkodie's hip-hop song "Biibi Ba", which was nominated for the Best Hiphop Song at the 2019 Vodafone Ghana Music Awards.

On 8 August 2019, Ghana disc jockey DJ Black released a controversial list of the country's top 50 rappers, on which he placed Amerado in the forties. On 1 October 2020, Reggie Rockstone, an influential figure in Ghanaian music genre hiplife, called Amerado one of the best rappers to ever come from Ghana.

In 2020, Amerado joined Shatta Wale and other rappers in Kumasi to release Ahodwo Las Vegas. In August 2021, Amerado had a freestyle and interview session with Tim Westwood on Capital Xtra in London. GRM Daily reported his freestyle session as one of the best on the show.

Amerado released his second extended play Patience on 26 October 2021, featuring Black Sherif, Shatta Wale, Fameye, YPee and Kweku Flick, with production from Azee Ntwene, Izjoe Beatz, Samsney and ItzCJ Madeit. The EP peaked at  1 on music streaming platforms Apple Music, Audiomack, Boomplay and YouTube. The EP was adjourned the BEST EP at the 2022 3Music Awards. Amerado is the first Kumasi-based artist to win the Rapper of the Year award at the 3Music Awards. In May 2020, Audiomack listed Amerado in Top 10 African Artists to look out for which also featured A-Reece, Nandy, Joey B and others.

On 25th October 2022, Amerado released his debut studio album, G.I.N.A, which featured S1mba, Fameye, Eno Barony, Laioung, Efya, Gidochi, Lasmid and Epixode.

Style 
Amerado raps and sings mostly in the Twi dialect of the Akan language of Ghana, but he sometimes uses English as well. His stage name, Amerado, which means 'Governor' in Akan, was chosen to assert his command of the music scene.

Brand ambassador 
Amerado is the brand ambassador for Ghana-made chocolates, an initiative of the Ghana Cocoa Board. He wrote the song "Ghana Chocolate" to promote the campaign. He has also worked with Vodafone Ghana, AirtelTigo, HD Plus, GoTV, Cheezzy Pizza and other brands.

Live performances 

Amerado's notable live performances include the Vodafone Ghana Music Awards, S-Concert, Rapperholic Show, the 2019 Ghana Music Awards UK, VGMA Xperience Concert, Ghana DJ Awards and the Ghana Party in the Park, UK.

Awards and nominations

Co-nominee / co-winner

Videography

Discography

Selected singles 
 I Am
 At My Back
 Beast Attitude
Mix Master Garzy – Peace Forever (as a featured act)
Edem – Kporda Remix (as a featured act)
 Redemption I
 Redemption II
 Menpe
Pistol  Cabum
Gods ft Kuami Eugene & Koo Ntakra
Sarkodie – Biibi Ba (as a featured act)
Twa So ft Fameye
Box of Memories
Kyer3 Me ft Okyeame Kwame
Shatta Wale – Ahodwo Las Vegas (as a featured act)
Best Rapper
Dawgi ft. Sarkodie
Indelible Flow
Taxi Driver
Me Ho Y3
Younger K.A
Death Sentence
We Outside ft Kofi Jamar
The Throne
Metua ft Kuami Eugene
Eno Barony - The Finish Line (as a featured act)
Obiaa Boa
Back to Sender
Grace ft Lasmid

Extended Plays 

 Rapmare EP
Patience EP

Albums 
 G.I.N.A (2022)

References 

Living people
Ghanaian rappers
1995 births
People from Kumasi
Ghanaian musicians